Corallorhiza bentleyi is a rare species of orchid known deciduous forests in the mountains of Virginia and West Virginia. It was undescribed until 1999.

It is a parasitic plant, with yellow to reddish stems and cleistogamous flowers.

References

External links
US Department of Agriculture Plants Profile
Go Orchids, North American Orchid Conservation Center
Digital Atlas of the Virginia Flora

bentleyi
Parasitic plants
Myco-heterotrophic orchids
Flora of West Virginia
Flora of Virginia
Endemic flora of the United States
Plants described in 1999
1999 in West Virginia
Flora without expected TNC conservation status